Eurasia International Film Festival is an international film festival held in Kazakhstan. With the exception of the fifth, held in Astana, all the editions were held in Almaty.

During the seventh festival in 2011, the Alley of Stars of Kazakh Cinema was inaugurated.

Major award winners

References

External links
 eurasiafestival.kz official site

Festivals in Kazakhstan
Film festivals in Kazakhstan